Cathy Grainger-Brain (born 20 September 1967) is an Australian former judoka. She competed at the 1992 Summer Olympics and the 1996 Summer Olympics.

References

External links
 

1967 births
Living people
Australian female judoka
Olympic judoka of Australia
Judoka at the 1992 Summer Olympics
Judoka at the 1996 Summer Olympics
Sportspeople from Canberra
Commonwealth Games medallists in judo
Commonwealth Games bronze medallists for Australia
Judoka at the 1990 Commonwealth Games
20th-century Australian women
21st-century Australian women
Medallists at the 1990 Commonwealth Games